Luther Elkins (May 26, 1809 – December 13, 1887) was an American politician and pioneer in the state of Oregon. Born in Cornville, Maine and married to Philotheta Williams, he immigrated to the Oregon Territory in 1852, overland via the Oregon Trail. He served in the Oregon Territorial Legislature and was a delegate to the Oregon Constitutional Convention. He was elected to the Oregon State Senate in 1858, serving in the 1859 special session, for which he was selected as the Oregon Senate's first President. He also served in the 1860 regular session, again as president.

He died in 1887, on December 13, and is buried at the Pioneer Cemetery in Lebanon, Oregon.

References

External links
Google Books

1809 births
1887 deaths
People from Somerset County, Maine
Members of the Oregon Constitutional Convention
Members of the Oregon Territorial Legislature
Presidents of the Oregon State Senate
Oregon pioneers
19th-century American politicians